Jean Le Fevre may refer to:
 Jean Le Fèvre de Saint-Remy (died 1468), Burgundian chronicler
 Jean Le Fèvre (canon) (1493–1565), French canon
 Jean Le Fèvre (astronomer) (1652–1706), French astronomer and physicist
 Jean le Fèvre Ressons, in Ressons-sur-Matz (Oise), poet and attorney at the Paris Parliament